Shadwell is a London Overground station in Shadwell in East London. It was formerly a London Underground station on the East London line until 2007. It is located near to Shadwell DLR station. The station is in Travelcard Zone 2.

The Overground station is underground (the DLR station is on a viaduct).

The Overground platforms are decorated with enamel panels designed by Sarah McMenemy in 1995.

History

London Underground
The original station was one of the oldest on the network, and was built over a spring. First opened by the East London Railway on 10 April 1876, it was first served by the District Railway and Metropolitan Railway on 1 October 1884. It was renamed Shadwell & St. George-in-the-East on 1 July 1900, but reverted to its original name in 1918. A new ticket hall was built on Cable Street in 1983, replacing the original building in Watney Street, which was demolished in May 2010. Access to the station platforms was through lifts or stairs. The station was closed between 1995 and 1998, owing to repair work on the East London line's Thames Tunnel. The typical off-peak East London line service from the station was:

9 tph to 
5 tph to 
4 tph to

London Overground
A new gated northern access fronting Cornwall Street has been added, easing interchange with Shadwell DLR station, while the rest of the station has been heavily refurbished.

Services
All times below are correct as of the December 2012 timetables.

London Overground

East London Line
There is a service every 3–5 minutes throughout the day. Current hourly off-peak frequency is:

16 tph to Dalston Junction, of which 8 continue to Highbury & Islington
4 tph to West Croydon
4 tph to 
4 tph to 
4 tph to  via

Connections
London Buses routes 100, 339 and D3 serve the station.

References

Railway stations served by London Overground
Railway stations in the London Borough of Tower Hamlets
Former East London Railway stations
Railway stations in Great Britain opened in 1876
Railway stations with vitreous enamel panels
London Overground Night Overground stations